Forced to Fight may refer to:

 Bloodfist III: Forced to Fight, 1992 film
 1944: Forced to Fight, 2015 film directed by Elmo Nüganen
 Forced to Fight, 2011 film directed by Jonas Quastel and starring Gary Daniels and Peter Weller
 "Force To Fight", song by Capital Theatre